A burnout (also known as a peel out, power brake, or brakestand) is the practice of keeping a vehicle stationary and spinning its wheels, the resultant friction causing the tires to heat up and smoke.

History 

The origins of burnouts can be traced to drag racing, where they have a practical purpose: drag racing slicks perform better at higher temperatures, and a burnout is the quickest way to raise tire temperature immediately prior to a race. They also clean the tire of any debris and lay down a layer of rubber by the starting line for better traction. Drag race tracks sometimes use a specially-reserved wet-surface area known as the "water box", because water is poured onto a certain area to reduce the friction to initiate the burnout. This was once called a "bleach box", when bleach was used instead of water; this began in 1969, the year the first burnout was done in NHRA, at the Hot Rod Magazine Championship Drag Races in Riverside, California. Don Garlits was the first to do burnouts across the starting line, which is now standard practice. Water, bleach and resin were used, and water is said to work as well as bleach. Early on, traction compound RFI also produced the spectacular flame burnouts. The hazard of using flammable traction compound led NHRA to mandate use of water, instead.  

Burnouts eventually became a serious form of competition and entertainment in their own right. Considerable prize money or goods are sometimes involved, and cars may even be sponsored or purpose-built specifically as "burnout cars". Burnout contests are judged on crowd response, with style and attitude therefore being important factors. Such contests are particularly popular in Australia but often occur in North America as well.

Burnouts are also common in informal street racing, usually for show value. As with all street racing activities, burnouts on public property are illegal in most countries but the severity of punishments vary. In New South Wales, Australia, for example, police have the power to confiscate the offending vehicle for 3 months for a first offense. In March 2010, British Formula 1 World Champion, Lewis Hamilton had his Mercedes car impounded for allegedly performing a burnout in Melbourne, Australia while leaving the Albert Park Grand-Prix Circuit.

Burnouts are also frequently performed by winning drivers at the end of NASCAR races to celebrate their victory.

Practice 

Performing a burnout in a front wheel drive vehicle is usually achieved by engaging the parking brake to lock up the rear tires along with stomping the gas to break the front wheels loose.

To perform a burnout in a rear wheel drive vehicle the driver has to simultaneously engage the gas and brake pedals. The brake pedal will require modulation, as the goal is to allow the rear tires to spin while holding the car in place with the front wheels remaining motionless. At a certain point of balance, the front brakes will prevent the car from moving forward while the rear brakes will have insufficient grip to keep the wheels from spinning, since engine power is transferred to the rear wheels only.

To do a burnout in a manual transmission vehicle you first start in neutral, then you press and hold the clutch, shift into first gear, floor the gas, and finally dump the clutch and quickly move your foot onto the brake pedal to hold the brakes. After this you can then release off the brakes to peel out or you can stand on it. It is worth noting that this will put a large amount of strain on your drivetrain due to the shock from engaging the clutch.

It is possible to make rear-wheel drive burnouts easier by installing "line locks", which allows the front brakes to be selectively activated by holding down a switch and releasing the brake pedal and freeing the rear brakes.

Burnouts are most difficult to perform in four-wheel drive and all-wheel drive cars, as they have better traction than FWD or RWD vehicles. It requires significantly more powerful engines to break all four tires loose at the same time, and the tires will spin for only a short while before all four gain traction.

Other techniques 

Another burnout technique is aimed at cars with insufficient power to perform a burnout from a standing-still position. It involves putting the car into reverse, reversing at a higher speed than normal and then quickly putting the car into first gear and hitting the accelerator. A variant of this is to reverse at an angle which will result in two (for cars with limited slip differentials) distinctive skidmarks once the car pushes forward — in Arab parts of the world, this trick is called the "88", as the skidmarks resemble two number-eights in Arabic ("٨ ٨"). In the United States, these marks are referred to as "fishhooks", a very accurate description of the skidmarks as the car will leave a longer mark when the vehicle's velocity becomes aligned with its forward direction. During this stunt, the vehicle always experiences a (not necessarily constant) acceleration vector pointing along the car's forward direction, but the velocity vector will reverse direction from initially pointing backwards to forward, leaving the "hook" mark.

At least as late as the 1970s in the United States, burnout enthusiasts would occasionally coat their (usually rear) drive wheel tires with a liquid chlorine-type bleach. This would result in spectacular bursts of white smoke during the burnout.

These and similar techniques are generally not recommended because they place a great load on drivetrain components and can result in transmission damage. The effective lifetime of the drive wheel tires is appropriately shortened.

An additional technique sometimes used by those celebrating a race victory (such as in NASCAR) is to position the racecar so that its nose is against the outside wall of the track, helping keep the car in place as the rear wheels spin.

See also 
 Doughnut
 Drifting
 Line lock
 Wheelspin
 Friction
 Motorcycle stunt riding

References

External links

 Burnouts: An Appreciation - John Pearley Huffman, Car and Driver, February 2011

Driving techniques
Motorcycle stunts
Tires
Articles containing video clips

de:Fahrtechnik#Burn-out